Daniel Ramírez Fernández (born 18 June 1992) is a Spanish professional footballer who plays as an attacking midfielder or central midfielder for Belgian club Zulte Waregem.

Career
Born in Leganés, Ramírez arrived at the academy of Real Madrid from CD Leganés in 2008. Three years later, he made his debut with the C team, in Tercera División. On 1 July 2014, he signed with Valencia CF and was assigned to the reserve team. On 2 November, he scored his first goal for the club in a 2–1 victory against Hércules CF.

In January 2016, Ramírez moved to Getafe CF and was assigned to the reserve team. On 13 October, he stepped one tier lower and joined Tercera División side Internacional de Madrid CF.

On 25 August 2017, Ramírez moved abroad for the first time in his career and joined Polish second-tier club Stomil Olsztyn on a one-year contract. On 25 June 2018, he moved to fellow league club ŁKS Łódź on a two-year deal.

On 6 February 2020, he signed a three-and-a-half years contract with Ekstraklasa side Lech Poznań. Initially a centre-piece of Lech's offensive line-up, he was relegated to featuring mostly off the bench after the appointment of manager Maciej Skorża in April 2021. Two months after winning the league title, on 28 July 2022, Ramírez terminated his contract with Lech by mutual consent.

On 1 August 2022, Ramírez signed a contract with Zulte Waregem in Belgium for two years with an option to extend.

Career statistics

Honours
Lech Poznań
 Ekstraklasa: 2021–22

References

External links

1992 births
Living people
Association football midfielders
Spanish footballers
Segunda División B players
Tercera División players
I liga players
Ekstraklasa players
Belgian Pro League players
Real Madrid C footballers
Valencia CF Mestalla footballers
Getafe CF B players
Internacional de Madrid players
OKS Stomil Olsztyn players
ŁKS Łódź players
Lech Poznań players
S.V. Zulte Waregem players
Spanish expatriate footballers
Expatriate footballers in Poland
Spanish expatriate sportspeople in Poland
Expatriate footballers in Belgium
Spanish expatriate sportspeople in Belgium